Vogue may refer to:

Business
 Vogue (magazine), a US fashion magazine
 British Vogue, a British fashion magazine
 Vogue Arabia, an Arab fashion magazine
 Vogue Australia, an Australian fashion magazine
 Vogue China, a Chinese fashion magazine
 Vogue France, a French fashion magazine
 Vogue Greece, a Greek fashion magazine
 Vogue India, an Indian fashion magazine
 Vogue Italia, an Italian fashion magazine
 Vogue Mexico & Latin America, a Latin American fashion magazine
 Vogue Poland, a Polish fashion magazine
 Vogue Records, a short-lived American 1940s label
 Disques Vogue, a French jazz record company
 Singer Vogue, two generations of British cars manufactured by Singer
 Vogue Tyre, a wheel manufacturer based in Chicago
 The Vogue Theater, Chula Vista, California, United States
 Vogue Theatre, Vancouver, British Columbia, Canada
 Vogue Theatre - see List of theatres in Louisville, Kentucky
 Vogue (cigarette), an upmarket cigarette brand
 HTC Vogue, a codename for the HTC Tough Pocket PC
 The Vogue, venue in Broad Ripple Village, Indianapolis, US

Music
 The Vogue, an American rock band from Seattle
 "Vogue" (Madonna song), 1990
 "Vogue" (KMFDM song), 1992
 "Vogue" (Ayumi Hamasaki song), 2000
 "The Vogue", a song by Antonelli Electr. featuring Miss Kittin

Places
 Vogue, Cornwall, UK, a hamlet
 Vogüé, a village in Ardèche department, France

People
 Eugène-Melchior de Vogüé (1848–1910), French diplomat
 Melchior de Vogüé (1829–1916), French archaeologist, uncle of the above
 Vogue Williams (born 1985), Irish model

Other uses
 Vogue (dance), a highly stylized, modern house dance

See also
 New Vogue (dance), an Australian form of sequence dancing
 Voulge, a medieval weapon